Bennett Brook is a river in Greene County, New York. It converges with West Kill east of the hamlet of West Kill, New York. Bennett Brook drains the northwestern slopes of North Dome and the northeastern slopes of Mount Sherrill.

References 

Rivers of New York (state)
Rivers of Greene County, New York